The Exiles (1961) is a film by Kent MacKenzie chronicling a day in the life of a group of 20-something Native Americans who left reservation life in the 1950s to live in the district of Bunker Hill, Los Angeles, California. Bunker Hill was then a blighted residential locality of decayed Victorian mansions, sometimes featured in the writings of Raymond Chandler, John Fante, and Charles Bukowski. The structure of the film is that of a narrative feature, the script pieced together from interviews with the documentary subjects. The film features Yvonne Williams, Homer Nish, and Tommy Reynolds.

Plot
The film is about Native Americans who have left their reservations in the Southwest. It follows them in Bunker Hill, a gritty neighborhood in Los Angeles. The cast of American Indian actors are notable for their lack of self-consciousness as they drink and socialize during a night out on the town ending in a 49 party of drumming and dancing on "Hill X" overlooking downtown LA.

Production
Filming was started in the late 1950s. The film features rock and roll music provided by Anthony Hilder and Robert Hafner. It was performed by The Revels, who recorded on Hilder's Impact record label. Years later Norman Knowles of The Revels recalled some of the tracks they recorded for the film. They included "It's Party Time" and possibly "Revellion". According to Knowles, the song "Commanche" which was written for the movie was cut.

Release
The Exiles premiered at the 1961 Venice Film Festival. As it was only licensed (16mm version) to schools and churches, it did not find a distributor to release it theatrically in that year, and so over the years it fell into obscurity, known to cinephiles but remaining largely unseen by the public. A restored version produced by the UCLA Film and Television Archive premiered at the Berlin Film Festival in February 2008, and Milestone Films released it commercially and on DVD in summer 2008.

Legacy
In 2009, it was named to the National Film Registry by the Library of Congress for being "culturally, historically or aesthetically" significant and will be preserved for all time.

Years later, Variety film critic Dennis Harvey's review of the 2015 film Mekko, about a Native American, mentioned The Exiles and On the Bowery (1956); he referred to the two older films as being classics also set on skid row.

Cast

 Yvonne Williams
 Homer Nish
 Tommy Reynolds
 Rico Rodrigues
 Clifford Ray Sam
 Clydean Parker
 Mary Donahue
 Eddie Sunrise as singer on Hill X
 Jacinto Valenzuela
 Ann Amiador as waitress at The Ritz
 Delos Yellow Eagle
 Louis Irwin
 Norman St. Pierre
 Marilyn Lewis as Yvonne’s friend
 Bob Lemoyne
 Ernest Marden
 Frankie Red Elk

 Chris Surefoot
 Sedrick Second
 Leonard Postock
 Eugene Pablo
 Matthew Pablo
 Sarah Mazy
 Gloria Muti
 Arthur Madrull as man being shaved
 Ted Guardipee
 Ned Casey
 Jay Robidaux
 I. J. Walker
 Julia Escalanti as Rico's wife
 Danny Escalanti as boy with skypiece
 Della Escalanti
 Tony Fierro

Production crew
 Written, produced, and directed by Kent MacKenzie
 Cinematography by Erik Daarstad, Robert Kaufman, John Morrill
Production by Ronald Austin, Sam Farnsworth, John Morrill, Erik Daarstad, Robert Kaufman, Beth Pattrick, Sven Walnum, Paula Powers
 Additional photography by Sven Walnum, Nicholas Clapp, Vilis Lapenieks.
 Archive photographs by Edward S. Curtis
 Editing by Kent Mackenzie, Warren Brown, Thomas Conrad, Erik Daastad, Thomas Miller, Beth Patrick
 Music by Anthony Hilder, The Revels, Robert Hafner, Eddie Sunrise
 Sound by Sam Farnsworth
 Sound effects edited by Thomas Conrad

Additional crew

Marvin Walowitz
Lawrence Silberman
Stuart Hanisch
Mindaugus Bagdon
Charles Smit
Judy Bradford

Ken Nelson
Ron Honthaner
David MacDougall
James Christensen
Stanley Follis
Ramon Ponce

See also
 List of American films of 1961

References

External links
 
 
The Exiles essay by Catherine Russell at National Film Registry 
The Exiles essay by Daniel Eagan in America's Film Legacy, 2009-2010: A Viewer's Guide to the 50 Landmark Movies Added To The National Film Registry in 2009-10, Bloomsbury Publishing USA, 2011,  pages 103-106 
 Milestone Films (distributor)

1961 films
American documentary films
American black-and-white films
Documentary films about Native Americans
United States National Film Registry films
1961 documentary films
1960s English-language films
1960s American films